Erik Figueroa (born 4 January 1991) is a Chilean-Swedish footballer who plays for Akropolis.

Career

Club career
Figueroa grew up in Sundbyberg. He played for AIK during his youth years. On his 20th birthday, he signed a professional contract with Hammarby IF after previously playing in the cooperation club Hammarby IF. Figueroa left Hammarby after the 2013 season when the club decided to not extend his contract.

On 25 February 2014, Figueroa signed with Division 1 club Vasalunds IF. Before the 2015 season, he moved to IK Sirius.

In December 2016, Figueroa was recruited by IF Brommapojkarna, where he signed a two-year contract. On 9 January 2019, Figueroa was joined Chilean club Unión La Calera. On 20 January 2020, Figueroa then moved back to Sweden and joined Helsingborgs IF, where he signed a one-year contract.

On 20 March 2021, Figuero signed with Akropolis.

Personal life
His mother is Swedish and his father is Chilean. Figueroa is a dual national; he holds a Swedish EU passport as well as a Chilean passport.

References

External links 
 

1991 births
Living people
People from Sundbyberg Municipality
Swedish footballers
Swedish expatriate footballers
Swedish people of Chilean descent
Sportspeople of Chilean descent
Citizens of Chile through descent
Chilean footballers
Chilean expatriate footballers
Hammarby Talang FF players
Hammarby Fotboll players
Vasalunds IF players
IK Sirius players
AFC Eskilstuna players
IF Brommapojkarna players
Unión La Calera footballers
Helsingborgs IF players
Akropolis IF players
Allsvenskan players
Superettan players
Ettan Fotboll players
Chilean Primera División players
Association football midfielders
Naturalized citizens of Chile